Ayan (Arabic: عَيَّان ‘ayān) is an Arabic male given name meaning "watchful, seeing, witnessing, viewing" which is a connotation to the Arabic word ‘ayn (عين) meaning "eye" or "sight". Similar names with different spelling Aayan and Ayaan.

Notable people with this name

Ayan 
 Ayan Allahverdiyeva, Azerbaijani chess player
 Ayan Babakishiyeva, Azerbaijani singer and actress
 Ayan Bhattacharjee, Indian cricketer
 Ayan Broomfield, Canadian tennis player
 Ayan Mukerji, Indian film director
 Ayan Pal, Indian author and public speaker
 Ayan Sadakov, Bulgarian footballer
 Wael Ayan (born 1985), Syrian international footballer

Ayaan 
 Ayaan Hirsi Ali, Somali-born Dutch-American activist, feminist, author, scholar and politician
 Ayaan Khan (born 1992), Indian cricketer
 Ayaan Ali Khan, Indian classical musician

Ayyan 
 Ayyan Ali, Pakistani model and singer known professionally as Ayyan

See also
Ayan (disambiguation)

Ayane, an unrelated name

References